The Turkish Gambit is a 2005 Russian historical spy film, an adaptation of Boris Akunin's novel The Turkish Gambit featuring his most famous character, the detective Erast Fandorin. It was directed by Dzhanik Fayziev and written by Akunin himself. The film starred Marat Basharov, Yegor Beroyev, and Olga Krasko. The Turkish Gambit was a box office success, although it received mixed reviews from critics.

Plot
The film takes place in Bulgaria during the Russo-Turkish War (1877–1878). Erast Fandorin is put on the trail of a Turkish agent who is trying to disrupt the Russian advance during the Siege of Plevna. The agent, known as Anwar Efendi, is a master of disguise and has excellent command of Russian.

Change from the book
Unlike the ending of the book, where French correspondent d'Hervais is exposed as being Anwar in disguise, in the film Anwar turns out to have been posing as a seemingly awkward and stupid Russian captain.

In the book, unlike the film, Fandorin did not escape by clinging to the underbelly of a carriage but was actually released by the governor of Viddin Yusuf Pasha after winning a wager.

The scene where Varvara and Fandorin flew in the balloon never took place in the book and Varvara had no role in discovering the weaknesses of the Turkish defenses.

The scene in the cave with the Lieutenant Luntz did not take place in the book. The character of the homosexual Luntz was created for the movie. The homosexual nature of Kazanzaki is never alluded to in the film. In fact, Fandorin was never once shot at by Anwar Effendi in the book.

In the book, the evidence for Colonel Lukan's involvement in treason was found on him and not in his tent like in the film.

Colonel Lukan was killed in a duel whereby sabres were used rather than pistols.

The book refers to three main failed assaults on Plevna. The film shows only two.

In the book, when Fandorin hears about Osman Pasha's plans to 'surrender' he rushes to Sobolev to urge him to attack Plevna and not to the meeting point of the Turkish 'envoys'.

In the film Fandorin went to Istanbul and showed up at the end in Turkish attire. In the book he never went to Istanbul and arrived wearing European clothing.

In the film Fandorin was happy to see his old friend Count Zurov when Zurov first arrived, whereas in the book the Zurov and Fandorin were not close friends and the first meeting in the tent was rather chilly.

Cast
Egor Beroev as Erast Fandorin
Olga Krasko as Varvara Suvorova
Marat Basharov as Gridnev
Vladimir Ilyin as General Mizinov (based on Nikolay Mezentsov)
Dmitry Pevtsov as Zurov
Viktor Verzhbitsky as Lukan
Aleksandr Baluev as General Sobolev (based on Mikhail Skobelev)
Aleksey Guskov as Kazanzaki
Gosha Kutsenko as Ismail-Bey
Andrey Krasko as Officer
Leonid Kuravlyov as Retired Major
Yevgeni Lazarev as Tsar Alexander II
Didier Bienaimé as D'Hevrais
Viktor Bychkov
Sergey Gazarov as Gubernator
Aleksandr Lykov as Perepyolkin (based on Aleksey Kuropatkin)
Anatoly Kuznetsov
Andrey Rudensky
Valdis Pelsh
Daniel Olbrychski as McLaughlin (based on Januarius MacGahan)
Miki Iliev
Raicho Vasilev as Bodyguard
Aleksandr Aleksandrov as Secret agent
Daniel Rashev

Anachronisms
In the opening scene, in the background, a Turkish man says a prayer in Turkish. He says "Long live the Turkish republic", when the Turkish Republic would only be established in 1922, many decades after the time in which the film is set.

References

External links
 Official site
 
 The Turkish Gambit (TV version)
 The Turkish Gambit - 1 episode from Channel One Russia
 Attack on Pleven – scene about the Siege of Pleven

Films based on works by Boris Akunin
Russian spy films
2005 films
2000s historical adventure films
Russian action war films
2000s action adventure films
2000s Russian-language films
Russian mystery thriller films
Films shot in Bulgaria
Russian historical adventure films
Russian action adventure films
Films set in the Ottoman Empire
Films set in Bulgaria
Films about the Russian Empire
Russo-Turkish War (1877–1878)